

T

Notes
  TCI is common IATA code for Tenerife–South Airport  and Tenerife–North Airport .
  TYO is common IATA code for Narita International Airport , Haneda Airport  and Yokota Air Base .

References

  - includes IATA codes
 
 Aviation Safety Network - IATA and ICAO airport codes
 Great Circle Mapper - IATA, ICAO and FAA airport codes

T